Suchindram railway station (station code: SCH) is found between Thiruvananthapuram–Nagercoil–Kanyakumari line. The station has one platform and falls on the Kanyakumari–Thiruvananthapuram line in the Thiruvananthapuram railway division of the Southern Railway zone. At present no trains halt at this station.

Railway stations in Kanyakumari district